Christine Stephanie Nicholls, née Metcalfe, (born 23 January 1943) is an author and former editor of the Dictionary of National Biography. She spent her childhood in Kenya. Now retired, she lives in Oxford, England.

Early life

Nicholls was born in England and accompanied her parents to Kenya in 1947. She moved around Kenya as her father took a series of teaching posts until he was employed permanently at Mombasa Primary School in 1954. At this time Nicholls was a boarder at Kenya High School in Nairobi.

Career

In 1961 Nicholls went to Lady Margaret Hall, in Oxford University where she received her MA. She then attended St Anthony's College and received her D.Phil. Following her university education she was employed at the Institute of Commonwealth Studies at London University as a research fellow. She later worked as a freelance researcher for the BBC Arabic department.

Nicholls joined Oxford University Press in 1977 as Assistant Editor of the Dictionary of National Biography. She later became the editor and produced 5 volumes from 1981 to 1986. She has also written a number of other factual books under the name of C.S. Nicholls.

Works

 1971 The Swahili Coast, Politics, Diplomacy and Trade on the East African Littoral, (Allen & Unwin) 
 1981 Dictionary of Biography 1961–1970, with E.T. Williams (Oxford University Press) 
1986 Dictionary of Biography 1971–1980, with Lord Blake(Oxford University Press) 
1990 Dictionary of Biography 1981–1985, with Lord Blake (Oxford University Press) 
1996 Dictionary of Biography 1986–1990, (Oxford University Press) 
1993 Dictionary of National Biography–Missing Persons, (Oxford University Press) 
1990 Power, A Political History, (Harrup, OUP and various) 
1985 Cataract, (with Philip Awdry) (Faber & Faber) 
1996 Hutchinson Encyclopedia of Biography (Helicon) 
1998 David Livingstone, (Sutton Publications)  Written as part of a biographical series which Nicholls edited.
2000 A History of St Anthony’s College 1950–2000, (Macmillan) 
2002 Elspeth Huxley, A Biography, (HarperCollins) (Thomas Dunne Books in USA). 
2005 Red Strangers: the White Tribe of Kenya, (Timewell Press) 
2011 A Kenya Childhood, (blurb.com)

References

1943 births
Alumni of Lady Margaret Hall, Oxford
Kenyan women writers
Alumni of Kenya High School
Alumni of the University of London
Living people
English women writers
20th-century British writers
21st-century British writers
20th-century English women
20th-century English people
21st-century English women
21st-century English people